James Healy  (10 September 1910 – 10 December 1994) was a New Zealand geologist, volcanologist and music critic. He was born in Devonport, Auckland, New Zealand, on 10 September 1910.

In the 1982 New Year Honours, he was appointed an Officer of the Order of the British Empire, for services to geology and the community.

References

1910 births
1994 deaths
20th-century New Zealand geologists
Scientists from Auckland
New Zealand volcanologists
New Zealand Officers of the Order of the British Empire
20th-century New Zealand musicians